Physicist is the fourth solo album by Canadian musician Devin Townsend. The album was released on June 26, 2000, on Townsend's label, HevyDevy Records.

Physicist is distinguished from the rest of Townsend's solo portfolio for the crossing of the style of his work in Strapping Young Lad with elements that had been explored in Ocean Machine: Biomech and Infinity. Notably, the line-up of musicians featured on this album is identical to that of Strapping Young Lad.

Background
Physicist took several years to come to fruition. Townsend had previously played with Metallica's then-bassist Jason Newsted, in a short-lived thrash metal project called IR8. After the creation of an IR8 demo tape, Townsend and Newsted began work on a new project called Fizzicist, which they claimed would be "heavier than Strapping Young Lad". When the IR8 tape was leaked, Newsted's Metallica bandmates James Hetfield and Lars Ulrich learned of the project. Hetfield was "fucking pissed" that Newsted was playing outside the band, and Newsted was prevented by his bandmates from working on any more side projects.

Unable to continue working with Newsted, Townsend instead wrote the album himself, calling it Physicist. Townsend assembled his bandmates from his extreme metal project Strapping Young Lad. This was the only time this lineup was featured on one of Townsend's solo albums.

Musical style
The album combines Townsend's style with a thrash metal influence. David Ballard of Revolver described the album's sound as "a blend of summery melody and breathtaking brutality ... vaulting between Queen-like elegance and Dark Angel-like devastation."

Release
Physicist was released in June 2000 on Townsend's independent label, HevyDevy Records. It is distributed in Canada by HevyDevy, in Japan by Sony, and in Europe and North America by InsideOut. The album was released on Enhanced CD format, with a commentary on the album by Townsend.

The song "Kingdom" was re-recorded for The Devin Townsend Project's Epicloud, with vocals from Anneke van Giersbergen. Similarly, a re-recording of the song "Victim" is present on the bonus disc of Transcendence.

Reception

Physicist received positive reviews, but is generally considered a low point in Townsend's career. Townsend himself considers it his worst album to date. Trey Spencer of Sputnikmusic argued that while Physicist is "a pretty good listen" on its own merit, it is "one of the weakest" albums in Townsend's catalogue. He felt the album "comes off as a restrained version of Strapping Young Lad with hints of [Townsend's] other projects thrown in", and that most of the tracks don't "seem to go anywhere". In 2005, the album placed number 439 in Rock Hard magazine's book The 500 Greatest Rock & Metal Albums of All Time.

Much of the criticism of Physicist stems from its poor production. Spencer found the production "a little too reigned [sic.] in" and "muddy". This was felt by the band as well; drummer Gene Hoglan and the rest were dissatisfied with the way the sound was mixed.

Track listing

Personnel

Strapping Young Lad
 Devin Townsend – vocals, guitar, keyboards, production, engineering, arrangement
 Gene Hoglan – drums
 Byron Stroud – bass
 Jed Simon – guitar

Background vocals
 Chris Valagao
 Marina Reid
 Sharon Parker
 Teresa Duke

Production
 Mike Plotnikoff – mixing
 Chris Waddell – mastering
 Shaun Thingvold – engineering, digital editing
 Paul Silviera – engineering
 Matteo Caratozzolo – engineering
 Sawami Saito – assistance
 Roger Swan – assistance
 Tracy Turner – assistance, management
 Byron Stroud – assistance
 Seventh Wave Studios – CD enhancement

Artwork
 Clint Nielsen – layout, artwork, logos
 Gary Hunter – 3-D logo rendering
 Gloria Fraser – photography
 Tania Rudy – photography

Chart performance

References

External links
 Physicist (HevyDevy Records)
 Physicist (InsideOut Music)

2000 albums
Devin Townsend albums
Inside Out Music albums
Albums produced by Devin Townsend
Albums recorded at Hipposonic Studios